Tum Milay is a Pakistani romantic television drama that aired on ARY Digital. Serial premiered on 11 July 2016 after Eid ul Fitr. The drama featured actress Badar Khalil's return to the small screen.

Cast
Affan Waheed as Jibran
Sehar Afzal as Nimra
Ali Abbas
Maham Amir
Waseem Abbas
Shamim Hilaly
Badar Khalil as Jibran's grandmother
Usman Peerzada
Tauqeer Ahmed as Ali
Seemi Pasha
Huma Nawab as Farida

References

Pakistani television series
2016 Pakistani television series debuts
2017 Pakistani television series endings
ARY Digital original programming